The Sialkot-Lahore Motorway (M11)  is a north-south motorway in Punjab, Pakistan, which connects Sialkot to Lahore via eastern parts of the Punjab.
The total length of this motorway is 103 km. It was opened on 18 March 2020 at the cost of 44 billion rupees. It has reduced the travel time between Sialkot and Lahore to just 50 minutes instead of the alternative route via N-5 comprising 145 km and taking more than 2 hours. This new road connects the Sialkot and Lahore Airport junctions with an express travel mode of 1 hour, and would uplift the Sialkot city and the surrounding rural hinterlands.

Route
This motorway is 4 lane, having 9 interchanges, 8 flyovers, 20 bridges and 18 underpasses.[9x Interchange, 20x Brs, 18x Underpasses, 12x Subways, 23 Cattle Creeps & 207x culverts]. 3 industrial zones and 2 universities would also be established along with the project. It is linked with M2 and N5 through Lahore link road near Kala Shah Kaku. The route is running parallel to GT road, passing east of Kamoki, Gujranwala, Daska and is ending at Sambrial.

History
The LSM (Lahore Sialkot Motorway) was originally conceived by the Ex-Chief Minister of Punjab, Choudhry Pervaiz Elahi, in 2006 and its foundation stone was laid in 2007 by the ex-President of Pakistan, General Pervez Musharraf, its land was acquired but no actual construction work was started. According to the original plan, the LSM would have been opened to the public in 2008 at the cost of Rs 18bn but the Government of Punjab shelved the project due to political reasons. Later Prime Minister of Pakistan, Imran Khan, re-ordered construction of the LSM. The National Highway Authority (NHA) shortlisted only two companies — Frontier Works Organization (FWO) and a foreign firm for undertaking this project. 
Lahore Sialkot Motorway is first portion of M-11 which will run parallel to M-2 from Lahore to Islamabad. In next phase of M-12, its extension from  Sialkot To Kharian (via Gujrat) is under construction and final phase M-13 will be Kharian to Rawalpindi. It is link to M2 Motorway via Rawalpindi Ring Road.

Interchanges

See also
Motorways of Pakistan
National Highways of Pakistan
Transport in Pakistan
National Highway Authority

References
Sialkot-Lahore motorway project launched

Separate unit formed for Lahore-Sialkot Motorway

External links

M11
Transport in Sialkot